Desh Ke Dushman  is a 1989 Bollywood film directed by Swaroop Kumar, starring Raaj Kumar, Hema Malini, Aditya Pancholi, Mandakini, Sadashiv Amrapurkar, Bob Christo, Prema Narayan and Navin Nischol.

Cast 
 Raaj Kumar as Sher Khan
 Hema Malini as Inspector Kiran Gupta
 Aditya Pancholi as Umesh Gupta
 Mandakini as Anita
 Navin Nischol as Inspector Suraj Gupta
 Sadashiv Amrapurkar as Rakesh Verma "Raka"
 Om Shivpuri as Police Commissioner
 Chandrashekhar as Madan
 Tej Sapru as Pratap Verma
 Narendranath as Jagga

Plot

Soundtrack
Lyricist: Verma Malik

References

External links 

1980s Hindi-language films
1989 films
Films scored by Sonik-Omi